Chaetosoma colossa is a species of beetle in the family Chaetosomatidae. It is found in New Zealand.

References 

 

Chaetosomatidae
Beetles described in 2010
Beetles of New Zealand